Verleger Point is a point marking the west side of the entrance to Siniff Bay on the coast of Marie Byrd Land. It was mapped by the United States Geological Survey (USGS) from surveys and U.S. Navy air photos, 1959–65, and was named by the Advisory Committee on Antarctic Names (US-ACAN) for Lieutenant (j.g.) W.F. Verleger, U.S. Navy Reserve, Master of the Jacob Ruppert on the first trip to Bay of Whales (1933) during Byrd Antarctic Expedition, 1933–35.

Headlands of Marie Byrd Land